Christos Albanis may refer to:
 Christos Albanis (footballer, born 1994)
 Christos Albanis (footballer, born 1999)